Olympic Conference may refer to:
Olympic Conference (Illinois)
Olympic Conference (Indiana)
Olympic Conference (New Jersey)

See also
 Olympic Congress, a large gathering of representatives from the different constituencies of the Olympic Movement, organised by the International Olympic Committee